Zapan Bobrovnikovo is a rural locality (a village) in Yudinskoye Rural Settlement, Velikoustyugsky District, Vologda Oblast, Russia. The population was 29 as of 2002.

Geography 
Zapan Bobrovnikovo is located 13 km northeast of Veliky Ustyug (the district's administrative centre) by road. Demyanovo is the nearest rural locality.

References 

Rural localities in Velikoustyugsky District